Marduk-nādin-aḫḫē, inscribed mdAMAR.UTU-na-din-MU, reigned  1095–1078 BC, was the sixth king of the Second Dynasty of Isin and the 4th Dynasty of Babylon. He is best known for his restoration of the Eganunmaḫ in Ur and the famines and droughts that accompanied his reign.

Biography
He was related to all three of his immediate predecessors: his father was Ninurta-nādin-šumi, the third king, his brother was Nabu-kudurri-uṣur, the fourth king, and his nephew was Enlil-nādin-apli the fifth king, whom he revolted against and deposed. A reconstructed passage in the Walker Chronicle describes how while Enlil-nādin-apli was away campaigning in Assyria, supposedly marching to conquer the city of Assur itself, Marduk-nādin-aḫḫē and the nobles rebelled. On his return “to his land and his city. They [kill]ed him with the s[word].”

His relationship with his Assyrian counterpart, Tukultī-apil-Ešarra, was antagonistic and he launched a raid early in his reign into Assyria, capturing the cultic idols of Adad and Šala from Ekallāte, a town only around thirty miles from Assur. For his part, Tukultī-apil-Ešarra led several retaliatory raids into the heartland of Babylonia, recalled with typical bombastic rhetoric:

The Synchronistic History recalls the battles were in the first instance “by the Lower Zab, opposite Ahizûhina, and in the second year he defeated Marduk-nadin-ahhe at Gurmarritu, which is upstream from Akkad.” Although “Ugarsallu (immediately south of the Lesser Zab) he plundered as far as Lubda (located in the area of Arrapha). He ruled every part of Suhu (in the middle Euphrates Valley) as far as Rapiqu (southern border of Assyria),” these places are on the periphery of Babylonia and the idols were not recovered until centuries later:

Kudurru tradition

There are seven kudurrus, two building inscriptions, four Luristan bronze daggers, one "belonging to Šamaš-killani, officer of the king," a Sumerian inscription on a copper cylinder and one unpublished garment inventory attesting to this king. The kudurrus show normal real estate activity in northern Babylonia. One, issued by Aradsu, son of Rišnunak, grants independence from forced labor for the residents living near the mouth of the Ṣalmani Canal, dated to his first year. Another gives land to a certain Adad-zer-iqiša in grateful thanks for his efforts fighting the Assyrians and is dated to his 10th year. One of the witnesses is given as Abullu-tetaparâu, the son of the king of Babylon. Another, dated to his 13th year, confirms the ownership of seven GUR of arable land to a certain Iqīša-Ninurta and is witnessed in the city of Opis.

Another kudurru dated eight months earlier in the same year granted Iddin-Ninurta, a leather worker, two GUR of land and was witnessed by the same seven officers of royal service: Irība-Ištarān, the governor of Isin, Bābilāiu, the chamberlain, Eulmaš-šākin-šumi, the marshall, Marduk-andulli, the vizier, Enlil-mukîn-apli, the commandant, Ea-kudirri-ibni, the provincial governor and Nabû-nādin-aḫḫē, the overseer of the storehouse. As this was from Kār-Bēl-mātāti, a town probably in the vicinity of Babylon, it is thought the men were courtiers who accompanied the king in his travels. Only two of these officials, Bābilāiu and Nabû-nādin-aḫḫē, had been in office during Marduk-nādin-aḫḫē's first year, as they appeared in the sequence of seven witnesses on the earliest, "Aradsu, son of Rišnunak," kudurru. Another is a deed recording Marduk-naṣir’s purchase of land from Amêl-Enlil, son of Khanbi, for a chariot, saddles, two asses, an ox, grain, oil, and certain garments. This gives Šapiku, the son of Itti-Marduk-balāṭu, the “son” of Arad-Ea, as the land-surveyor and this is probably the same individual as the last witness, “scribe” and “son of Arad-Ea,” on a kudurru dated to Marduk-nādin-aḫḫē’s eighth year.

Kudurrus dated to his reign

 The Amrân ibn ‘Ali kudurru in the Walters Art Museum, Baltimore.
 Land grant to Adad-zer-iqiša kudurru, in the British Museum
 Marduk-naṣir land purchase kudurru, in the British Museum
 Aradsu, son of Rišnunak, tax exemption tablet, in the British Museum
 Iqīša-Ninurta land deed confirmation kudurru, in the National Museum of Iraq
 The Warwick (“Land grant to Iddin-Ninurta”) Kudurru, Warwickshire Museum
 Land purchase kudurru with a secondary inscription of Marduk-šāpik-zēri, in the Yale Babylonian Collection
Also assigned to this era is the undated Caillou Michaux (kudurru), in the Musée du Louvre.

Other sources
He restored the Eganunmaḫ at Ur, without any apparent alteration to the plan of Kassite king Kurigalzu’s (Kurigalzu I or II undetermined) original plan, and constructed a “kitchen complex” on the northwest side of the ziggurat. Three inscribed door-sockets were found at the sanctuary. He may be portrayed by the 3rd king in the Prophecy A,  whose reign is a successful and fertile 18 years, but whose rule comes to end in a revolt. According to a later commentator, a certain Ea-mušallim provided him with an astrological report (ittu ina šamȇ) concerning a solar eclipse in 1090.

An Assyrian Chronicle reports that Marduk-nadin-ahhe lost his throne and “disappeared” (šadâ ēmid) following disruptions caused by Arameans migrating into Mesopotamia under the pressure from famine, the Babylonians themselves apparently resorting to cannibalism, "[....they] ate one another's flesh..."

Notes

References

External links
 Kudurru image
 Article discussing "Marduk-nadin-ahhe Kudurru", (Boundary Stone)

Inscriptions

11th-century BC Babylonian kings
11th-century BC rulers
Kings of the Universe